The 1981 Volta a la Comunitat Valenciana was the 39th edition of the Volta a la Comunitat Valenciana road cycling stage race, which was held from 3 March to 8 March 1981. The race started in Vinaròs and finished in Valencia. The race was won by Alberto Fernández of the  team.

General classification

References

Volta a la Comunitat Valenciana
Volta a la Comunitat Valenciana
Volta a la Comunitat Valenciana
Volta a la Comunitat Valenciana